John Lahey may refer to:
 John L. Lahey (born 1946), American academic administrator
 John C. Lahey, American architect